František Čermák and Leoš Friedl were the defending champions, but lost in the semifinals to eventual champions Jiří Novák and Andrei Pavel.

Novak and Pavel won the title, defeating Marco Chiudinelli and Jean-Claude Scherrer in the final, 6–3, 6–1.

Seeds

Draw

Draw

External links
 Draw

Swiss Open (tennis)
2006 ATP Tour
2006 Allianz Suisse Open Gstaad